Sweet Rosie O'Grady is a 1926 American silent comedy drama film directed by Frank R. Strayer from a screenplay by Harry O. Hoyt. The film was released by Columbia Pictures on October 5, 1926, and stars Shirley Mason, Cullen Landis, and E. Alyn Warren.

Cast list
 Shirley Mason as Rosie O'Grady
 Cullen Landis as Victor McQuade
 E. Alyn Warren as Uncle Ben Shapiro
 William Conklin as James Brady
 Lester Bernard as Kibitzer
 Otto Lederer as Friend

Preservation status
With no prints of Sweet Rosie O'Grady located in any film archives, it is a lost film.

References

External links
 
 
 
 

1926 comedy-drama films
1920s English-language films
American silent feature films
Films directed by Frank R. Strayer
Columbia Pictures films
Lost American films
American black-and-white films
1926 films
1926 lost films
Lost comedy-drama films
1920s American films
Silent American comedy-drama films